Walk-off may refer to:
an event in a sporting event where the game-winning score immediately ends the game, such as a walk-off home run in baseball, a touchdown or field goal that's scored when there's no time left on the clock or during the overtime period, or a golden goal scored in sudden death in any sport. In timed sports this may also be known as a buzzer beater. (See also: Kicks after the siren in Australian rules football)
a political or economic protest (i.e., walkout)
Cummeragunja walk-off by Aboriginal people in New South Wales, 1939
Wave Hill walk-off by Gurindji stockmen in the Northern Territory of Australia, 1966
2018 Google walkouts

See also
Walk off the Earth